Highway 312 is a highway in the Canadian province of Saskatchewan. It runs from Highway 12 to Highway 2 near Wakaw.

Highway 312 passes near Waldheim, Laird, and Rosthern. It also connects with Highways 683, 11, and 225.

Major intersections
From west to east:

References

312